

The following lists events that happened during 1918 in Afghanistan.

Incumbents
 Monarch – Habibullah Khan

Events
Little news emerges from Afghanistan during the year. It is reported from India that the amir continues to maintain his neutrality in the war in a most scrupulous and loyal manner.

 
Afghanistan
Years of the 20th century in Afghanistan
Afghanistan
1910s in Afghanistan